The Final Experiment (originally Ayreon: The Final Experiment) is the debut studio album by the Dutch progressive metal project Ayreon, released in 1995. Originally with no artist noted, at the suggestion of the record label the subject was later detached, and used as the name for what was to be Dutch musician Arjen Anthony Lucassen's Ayreon project.

In 2004, Arjen moved to a new record label, Inside Out - with this move came re-issues of all the previous Ayreon releases, including The Final Experiment. This re-issue includes a bonus CD featuring nine re-worked recordings of tracks (or segments of tracks) found on the original album with different singers and all acoustic instrumentation.

The Final Experiment introduces several concepts which appear in future Ayreon albums, such as humanity's propensity for war ("Waracle"), polluting earth's environment ("Listen to the Waves"), or the gratuitous use of technology and computers in human society ("Computer-Reign (Game Over)"). The latter concept appears overtly in the tracks "Computer Eyes" from Actual Fantasy, and "Web of Lies" from 01011001, as well as "Evil Devolution" from Into the Electric Castle.

Creation
After leaving Vengeance in 1992, Arjen began working on writing and recording some solo material, with his newfound creative freedom. Finding motivation to commercialize the new music from his record company, Arjen released his first solo album in 1993 under his middle name, Anthony, entitled Pools of Sorrow, Waves of Joy. The album lacked a musical direction, and became a heterogeneous mixture of styles and genres. While the album was not commercially successful, it formed the groundwork for the Ayreon project to come.

A number of albums from the 1960s and 70s featuring common stylistic threads made a lifelong impact on Arjen. The dynamic and exciting music, emotionally driven lyrics, and an ensemble cast found in albums such as Andrew Lloyd Webber's Jesus Christ Superstar and The Who's Tommy, commonly referred to as rock operas, inspired Arjen to create one of his own. Working in an environment where he could develop an album exactly as he wanted, Arjen intended to create his vision, making no compromises along the way. His vision manifested itself in The Final Experiment and, after being rejected by several different record labels, was picked up by a small Dutch record label. The project was financially burdensome, but through some subsidization from his father, it was seen through to completion, and was successful enough to warrant another Ayreon release.

Concept

Prologue 
In the year 2084 scientists have found a way to send messages back into time using time telepathy. With the Earth nearly destroyed by many different causes, they have one hope for the experiment: warn the past of the future to avert the fate of Earth.

Act I 
The receiver of the telepathic messages is Ayreon, a blind minstrel living in 6th century Britain. He’s lived his life in darkness from the day he was born, but one fateful day everything changes — Ayreon can see images. The minstrel believes these visions are sent to him by the Lords of Time. Unaware of how much time there is left before Earth is destroyed Ayreon sets out to tell the tale of Earth’s demise singing songs of wars, natural disaster, and computer technology. The terrifying tales frighten the villagers who run him out of town.

Act II 
Alone, and cast out of his village, Ayreon goes to King Arthur’s castle, and, being a famed minstrel, he is allowed to sing of his visions in the King’s very own court.

Act III 
Jealous of his ability to foresee the future, Merlin, the court’s wizard, isn’t pleased with Ayreon’s message, convincing the court the minstrel must be a fake.

Act IV 
Merlin believes it is necessary to silence Ayreon forever and curses him. With the curse completed Merlin realizes his error, but it is too late. The wizard then predicts that the message will arrive in the mind of another minstrel at the end of the 20th century…

Track listing

Personnel

 Ayreon
 Arjen Anthony Lucassen - vocals (tracks 7, 10, 11 & 15), guitar, bass, keyboards, synthesizer, drums, percussion, timpani, audio mixing, sleeve design & photography

 Vocalists
 Barry Hay on "Sail Away To Avalon"
 Edward Reekers as Merlin on "Prologue," "The Awareness" and "Ayreon’s Fate;" as Ayreon on "The Awareness" and "Ayreon’s Fate"
 Ian Parry as Nobleman on "Ye Courtyard Minstrel Boy", "Computer Reign" and as Merlin on "Ayreon’s Fate"
 Jan-Chris de Koeijer on "The Banishment"
 Jay van Feggelen of Bodine as Merlin on "Ayreon's Fate" and "Waracle"
 Lenny Wolf on "Eyes Of Time"
 Leon Goewie as Merlin on "Merlin's Will" and "Ayreon's Fate" 
 Robert Soeterboek as Villagers on "The Banishment" and as Merlin on "Ayreon's Fate"
 Ruud Houweling as Ayreon on "The Charm Of The Seer"
 Lucy Hillen on "The Charm Of The Seer;" as Chorus on several tracks
 Debby Schreuder as Merlin, Women and Villagers on "Ayreon's Fate;" as Chorus on several tracks
 Mirjam van Doorn as Merlin, Women and Villagers on "Ayreon's Fate;" as Chorus on several tracks
Irene Jansen (bonus)
Marcela Bovio (bonus)
Peter Daltrey (bonus)
John Cuijpers	 (bonus)
Esther Ladiges (bonus)	
Rodney Blaze (bonus)	
Astrid van der Veen (bonus)	
Valentine (bonus)

 Keyboards
 Cleem Determeijer (tracks 2-6, 14)
 Rene Merkelbach (tracks 4, 6, 11, 12)

 Drums
 Ernst van Ee (tracks 2-4, 6-10, 12, 15)
 Davy Mickers

 Bass
 Peter Vink - acoustic bass (tracks 3-4, 7-8)
 Jolanda Verduijn (tracks 4, 6, 15)
 Jan Bijlsma (track 11)

 Cello
 Marieke van der Heyden
 Dewi Kerstens

 Artwork
 Ruud Houweling
 Richèle Nijst
 Jacoby Peters

 Designs
Richele Nijst - additional	
Jacoby Peeters - additional
Ruud Houweling - sleeve

 Miscellaneous
 Ewa Albering – flute
 Lori Linstruth – electric lead guitar solos
 Jeroen Goossens – assorted wind instruments
 Valentine – piano, vocals
 Oscar Holleman – engineering
Sjoerd Kops - photography
Peter Brussee - mastering
Oscar Holleman - production, mixing & engineering

References

1995 debut albums
Ayreon albums
Science fiction concept albums
Rock operas
Transmission (record label) albums